Jonas Johansson (born March 18, 1984) is a Swedish former professional ice hockey player who briefly played in the National Hockey League (NHL).

Playing career 
Johansson was drafted in the 1st round, 28th overall, by the Colorado Avalanche in the 2002 NHL Entry Draft. He was traded on October 23, 2003, to the Washington Capitals with Bates Battaglia for Steve Konowalchuk and the Capitals' 3rd round choice in the 2004 NHL Entry Draft.

Johansson started his hockey career with the Swedish Jönköping-based club HV71's junior team in 1999 and played with them for three seasons before moving to North America. In total he played 26 games, totaling 15 goals and 19 assists for 34 points in the Swedish junior league. In the Swedish elite league Elitserien during the 2001-02 season, he appeared in five regular games and two playoff games for HV71.

During the 2005–06 season with the Hershey Bears, Johansson scored three points in one game on January 6, 2006, against the Bridgeport Sound Tigers. In the same season, he also appeared in his only NHL game, going scoreless with the Capitals. After two seasons playing with the Bears, Johansson was loaned to the Grand Rapids Griffins on February 27, 2007. In early May 2007, after playing ice hockey for five seasons in North America, he signed a two-year deal with his former Swedish club HV71 in the Swedish elite league Elitserien.

On May 19, 2009, Johansson signed a one-year contract with VIK Västerås HK of the HockeyAllsvenskan for the 2009–10 season.

On August 31, 2010, Johansson signed a one-contract with SG Cortina in Italy for the 2010–11 season. After two productive seasons with Cortina, Johansson continued to play in the Serie A, but signed a one-year contract with rivals, HC Alleghe on October 12, 2012.

On April 30, 2013, Johansson opted to leave Italian hockey, and signed a contract with Norwegian club Frisk Asker Ishockey of the GET-ligaen. During the 2013–14 season, Johansson scored at a point-per-game pace with 28 goals and 44 points, to be amongst the league's top scorers. He tenure with Frisk was limited to one season as on May 22, 2014, he signed a one-year deal with German second league club Lausitzer Füchse.

After a season's hiatus, Johansson returned to competitive hockey during the 2018–19 season, agreeing to a contract with Swedish Division 2 club, HA74, on 20 December 2018.

Career statistics

Regular season and playoffs

International

Awards 
 AHL Calder Cup champion with Hershey Bears in 2006.
 Swedish Champion with HV71 in 2008.
 Coppa Italia champion 2012 with SG Cortina
 All star team coppa Italia 2012

References

External links

1984 births
Colorado Avalanche draft picks
Frisk Asker Ishockey players
Grand Rapids Griffins players
HC Alleghe players
Hershey Bears players
Kamloops Blazers players
Lausitzer Füchse players
Living people
National Hockey League first-round draft picks
Sportspeople from Jönköping
SG Cortina players
South Carolina Stingrays players
SønderjyskE Ishockey players
Stavanger Oilers players
Swedish ice hockey right wingers
IF Troja/Ljungby players
VIK Västerås HK players
Washington Capitals players
Swedish expatriate ice hockey players in Denmark
Swedish expatriate ice hockey players in Norway
Swedish expatriate ice hockey players in Germany
Swedish expatriate sportspeople in Italy
Swedish expatriate ice hockey players in Canada
Swedish expatriate ice hockey players in the United States